is Yoko Takahashi's 24th single produced by Columbia Records. It was released on August 27, 2008. Since it reached #174 in the Oricon weekly charts and currently sold a total of 473 copies, it is Yoko's worst selling single to date. The title track was used as the opening theme for the OVA Cobra The Animation.

Track listing 

Kizu Darake no Yume—4:01
Fantasy—4:50
Kizu Darake (Instrumental)
Fantasy (Instrumental)

References

2008 singles
J-pop songs
2008 songs
Columbia Records singles